Syrotyne is an urban-type settlement in Sievierodonetsk Raion (district) in Luhansk Oblast of eastern Ukraine. Population: 

Until 18 July 2020, Syrotyne was located in Sievierodonetsk Municipality. The municipality was abolished that day as part of the administrative reform of Ukraine and the number of raions of Luhansk Oblast was reduced to eight, of which only four were controlled by the government. Sievierodonetsk Municipality was merged into Sievierodonetsk Raion.

Demographics
Native language distribution as of the Ukrainian Census of 2001:
 Ukrainian: 71.34%
 Russian: 28.26%
 Others: 0.08%

References

Urban-type settlements in Sievierodonetsk Raion
Sievierodonetsk Raion